Stromatoveris psygmoglena is a genus of basal petalonam from the Chengjiang deposits of Yunnan that was originally aligned with the fossil Charnia (strictly, the Charniomorpha) from the Ediacara biota.  However, such an affinity is developmentally implausible and S. psygmoglena is now thought to be either a sessile basal ctenophore, or a sessile organism closely related to ctenophores. Nevertheless, a 2018 phylogenetic analysis by Jennifer Hoyal Cuthill and Jian Han indicated that Stromatoveris was a member of Animalia and closely related to ediacaran frond-like lifeforms.

Distribution
Cambrian of China.

References

Cambrian invertebrates
Maotianshan shales fossils
Prehistoric ctenophore genera
Petalonamae
Fossil taxa described in 2006
Cambrian genus extinctions